Horrat ol Abbas (also Romanized as Ḩorrat ol ‘Abbās; also known as Ḩorrat-e ‘Abbās) is a village in Hoveyzeh Rural District, in the Central District of Hoveyzeh County, Khuzestan Province, Iran. At the 2006 census, its population was 46, in 10 families.

References 

Populated places in Hoveyzeh County